Salimata et Taséré FC, known as Salitas FC, is a Burkinabé association football club, based in Ouagadougou.

They were promoted to the Burkinabé Premier League after the 2016–17 season. They stayed up in their first season after promotion, they are currently still in the Burkinabé Premier League. Their kits are green and orange in color and made by Sindio. They play their home games in the 30,000-capacity Stade du 4 Août.

Honours
Coupe du Faso: 1
 2018.

Burkinabé SuperCup: 1
 2018.

Performance in CAF competitions
CAF Confederation Cup: 2 appearances
 2019 – Group Stage
 2020 – First Round

Notable players

References

Football clubs in Burkina Faso
Sport in Ouagadougou
Salitas FC